The Shack is the nickname used by reporters for the police beat in New York City. In most cities, such a bureau is nicknamed a "cop shop." It is named after a cramped office located inside the NYPD headquarters, where journalists report on crime stories.

The first in-headquarters press bureau began in 1863, in the basement of the NYPD headquarters on Mulberry Street. In 1875, police superintendent George W. Walling expelled the press from the building, saying they were too intrusive in police matters. When the NYPD moved to its Beaux-Arts headquarters at 240 Centre Street in 1910, the press set up shop in a tenement across the street. Its poor conditions may have resulted in the nickname. This location was the office for several well-known reporters, including Gay Talese, David Halberstam, Joe Cotter and McCandlish Phillips. In 1973, the NYPD moved to its new Brutalist headquarters at One Police Plaza in the Civic Center. The Shack was installed in an office on the second floor of the new building. 

Its present tenants include Associated Press, New York Daily News, New York Post, The New York Times, Newsday, Staten Island Advance, El Diario, NY1 News and 1010 WINS. In April 2009, NYPD Commissioner Raymond W. Kelly said he would evict The Shack from Police Plaza by August to expand a command center, but as of 2016, the shack remains in the same location.

References 

New York City Police Department
Mass media in New York City